Adel Mohamed Aljabrin (also transliterated Al-Jabrin or Al Gabreen, born 5 January 1968) is an archer from the Saudi Arabia.

Aljabrin represent the Saudi Arabia at the 1988 Summer Olympics held in Seoul, South Korea, where he competed in the men's individual archery, where he finished in 83 place.

References

External links
 
 

1968 births
Living people
Saudi Arabian male archers
Olympic archers of Saudi Arabia
Archers at the 1988 Summer Olympics